Nakhla Jurji al-Motyei Pasha (23 April 1866–1951) was an Egyptian politician. He was Egypt's Minister of Foreign Affairs during the first half of 1933, in the government of Isma'il Sidqi.

Career 
Nakhla Jurji entered government service in 1883. He worked in the niyaba from 1891,then at the Ministry of Justice from 1904-1923. He was:
 Minister of Transportation, 24 November 1924 - 13 March 1925
 Interim Minister of Public Works, 1 December 1924 - 2 December 1924
 Minister of Agriculture, 12 September 1925 - 7 June 1926
 Minister of Public Works, 13 June 1928 - 2 October 1929
 Minister of Foreign Affairs 4 June 1933 - 10 July 1933.
Thereafter he resigned due to ill health.

References

Foreign ministers of Egypt
Egyptian pashas